Franz Josef Karl Edler von Matsch (16 September 1861, in Vienna – 5 October 1942, in Vienna), also known as Franz Matsch, was an Austrian painter and sculptor in the Jugendstil style. Along with Gustav and Ernst Klimt, he was a member of the Maler-Companie.

Further reading 
 
 Franz von Matsch. Ein Wiener Maler der Jahrhundertwende. Exhibit catalog. Vienna: Museen der Stadt Wien, 1981
 Alfred Weidinger, Agnes Husslein-Arco: Gustav Klimt und die Künstler-Compagnie. Belvedere, Vienna 2007,

External links 

 Entry for Franz von Matsch on the Union List of Artist Names

19th-century Austrian painters
19th-century Austrian male artists
Austrian male painters
20th-century Austrian painters
Austrian sculptors
Austrian male sculptors
Artists from Vienna
Edlers of Austria
1861 births
1942 deaths
Burials at Döbling Cemetery
Art Nouveau painters
Art Nouveau sculptors
20th-century sculptors
19th-century sculptors
20th-century Austrian male artists